The Church of St Peter, Llanwenarth, Monmouthshire is a parish church with reported origins in the 6/7th centuries. The current building dates from the early 14th century. Rebuilt in the 19th century, it was listed Grade II* in 1956. It remains an active Church in Wales church in the parish of Llanwenarth Citra.

History
The church's foundation is reputed to date from the 6/7th centuries but the present building was begun in the early 14th century. The tower has a construction date of 1631 although Cadw reports that it may be late-medieval in origin. The church was remodelled in 1877 by John Prichard and it remains an active parish church and a Grade II* listed building.

Architecture and description
The church is of Old Red Sandstone and is of a relatively large size. The style is Decorated Gothic. The interior contains a font which the architectural historian John Newman describes as "a very basic Norman tub". Most of the furnishings are by Prichard. In the nave is a late 18th-century monument by Walker of Bristol.

Notes

References
 

Grade II* listed churches in Monmouthshire
History of Monmouthshire
Church in Wales church buildings
14th-century church buildings in Wales